Communic is a Norwegian progressive metal band from Kristiansand. The band was founded in 2003 and has released six albums. The first two have received positive reviews from magazines and critics.

History

Beginning (March 2003–April 2004)
Communic was founded in March 2003 as a side project for Oddleif Stensland, guitarist, and Tor Atle Andersen, drummer, both from the band Scariot. Soon after, they were joined by bassist Erik Mortensen, who had been a bandmate of Stensland in a band called Ingermanland.  In January 2004, the band recorded its first three demo tracks at dUb Studios in Norway. While only 100 copies of the Conspiracy in Mind demo were printed, it would be selected as Demo of the Month by the magazine Rock Hard in April.  In March they signed with the Danish management company Intromental Management. In April, Stensland left Scariot to concentrate full-time on Communic.

Conspiracy in Mind (July 2004–2005)
In July 2004, Communic signed with the German label Nuclear Blast and in September began recording their debut album, Conspiracy in Mind in the Denmark studios of producer Jacob Hansen. Danish keyboardist Peter Jensen (ex-Sinphonia) played keyboards for the album. It was released on February 21, 2005, and received good reviews, being voted as "Album of the Month" in the magazines Rock Hard  and Heavy, Oder Was!?.  Rock Hard subsequently selected Communic as Newcomer of the Year. Following the album's release, Communic toured Europe with Ensiferum and Graveworm, including an appearance at the Gelsenkirchen Rock Hard Festival.  Jensen joined the band on the tour, but was not made a permanent member as he did not live in Norway.

Waves of Visual Decay (2006–2007)
In early 2006, the band flew once again to Denmark to record the follow-up to Conspiracy in Mind in Jacob Hansen's studios. This time, Norwegian Endre Kirkesola was brought in to record the keyboard parts in the album. Unlike Jensen, Kirkesola did not tour with the band to promote the album. The album, Waves of Visual Decay, was released in May 2006 and, like its predecessor, also received good critical reviews, being selected as Album of the Month (or Week, or Issue, depending on the magazine) in Swiss magazine Metal World, Portuguese magazine Metal Morfose, Norwegian magazine Scream, German magazines Rock Hard, Guitar Magazine, Metal Hammer, Metal Heart and Heavy, and the e-zine laut.de.

Payment of Existence (2008–2011)
Communic's third studio album, Payment of Existence, was released on May 30, 2008.

The Bottom Deep (2011–present)
Communic released their fourth studio record, The Bottom Deep, on July 22, 2011.

Where Echoes Gather (2017–present)
Communic released their fifth studio record, Where Echoes Gather, on October 27, 2017.

Hiding from the World (2020–present)
Communic released their sixth studio record, Hiding from the World, on November 20, 2020.

Members 
 Oddleif Stensland—vocals and guitars
 Erik Mortensen—bass
 Tor Atle Andersen—drums

Discography 
 Conspiracy in Mind (2005)
 Waves of Visual Decay (2006)
 Payment of Existence (2008)
 The Bottom Deep (2011)
 Where Echoes Gather (2017)
 Hiding from the World (2020)

References

External links 

[ Communic] at Allmusic

MySpace profile
August 2007 interview with Oddleif

Norwegian progressive metal musical groups
Norwegian power metal musical groups
Musical groups established in 2003
2003 establishments in Norway
Musical groups from Kristiansand
Nuclear Blast artists